The 2002–03 BYU Cougars men's basketball team represented Brigham Young University in the 2000–01 season. Led by head coach Steve Cleveland, the Cougars earned their first Mountain West Conference championship. This was also their first of three eventual NCAA Tournament appearances under Cleveland. This was also the Cougars' first tournament appearance since 1995.

Roster

Schedule and results

|-
!colspan=9 style=| Regular Season

|-
!colspan=9 style=| WAC tournament

|-
!colspan=9 style=| NCAA tournament

References

BYU Cougars men's basketball seasons
Byu
Byu